Aluminium acetoacetate is an antacid with the chemical formula C18H27AlO9.

Antacids
Aluminium complexes